The 2013-14 Israeli Basketball State Cup was the 54th edition of the Israeli Basketball State Cup, organized by the Israel Basketball Association. The semifinals and finals were played at the Nokia Arena in Tel Aviv.

Maccabi Tel Aviv defeated Hapoel Eilat 80-73 in the final, successfully defending their title. It was Maccabi Tel Aviv's 40th Israeli State Cup and 5th in a row.

Bracket

Semifinals

Final

References

See also
2013–14 Israeli Basketball Super League
Israeli Basketball State Cup

2013-14
State Cup